Isai Vellalar is a community found in India in Tamil Nadu. They are traditionally involved as performers of classical dance and music in Hindu temples and courts of the patrons. The term "Isai Vellalar" is a recent community identity, people of minstrel occupation from various castes such as, Melakkarar, Nayanakkarar, Nattuvanar and Vellalar come under this term.

Etymology 
The term Isai Vellalar derives from the Tamil words Isai meaning "music" and Vellalar a generic term roughly meaning "cultivator", thus translates as "cultivators of music". This term was introduced after the legal abolition of the Devadasi system as a result of the reform and anti-nautch movement in 1947.

History 
The Isai Vellalar communities were originally nomads. Bardic traditions are referred in early Sangam literature and well into the early Pallava and Pandya periods. These were primarily ritualistic and defensive in nature. The artistic side of music and dance came to be strengthened during the Chola and Vijayanagara period.

Early Chola inscriptions mentions Tevaratiyar as recipients of food offering and ritual performers of the temples, and was a term carrying honorific and high connotations. Inscriptional evidences indicates devadasis to have been independent professionals who enjoyed property (made large land donations to temples) and a respectable position in the society. The 11th-century inscription of Rajaraja I states that the Tevaratiyar were invited to serve the Brihadisvara Temple and were given land near the temple.

Under the patronage of the Nayaks of Tanjavur and Thanjavur Maratha kings, Telugu musicians from Andhra Pradesh and Maharashtra migrated to the Thanjavur region. The Melakkarars of Thanjavur are therefore divided in two distinct linguistic groups – the Tamil and Telugu Melakkarar.

With the entry of Colonial India, great loss of temple patronage resulted the Tevaratiyar to perceive other ways of income which degraded their social status. The Devadasi system was legally abolished in 1947 after the campaigns of the social reformers Moovalur Ramamirtham and Muthulakshmi Reddi. The entry of Tamil Brahmins in music and dance was seen as a threat to the traditional performers of these art forms. This led communities traditionally associated with music and dance to start forming a politicized non-Brahmin caste association which they coined as "Isai Vellalar Sangam" and thereby created a political unified identity.

Notable people

Historical personalities
Arunagirinathar
Muthu Thandavar

Social activists
Moovalur Ramamirtham
Muthulakshmi Reddi

Politicians
M Karunanidhi
Murasoli Maran
S. S. Thennarasu
MK Azhagiri
MK Stalin
Kanimozhi
Dayanidhi Maran

Business personalities
Kalanithi Maran
Prasanna Dhandayuthapani

Arts
Vazhuvoor Samu Nattuvanar
Thanjavur Quartet
T. N. Rajarathnam Pillai
Vazhuvoor Ramaiah Pillai
Kumbakonam Rajamanickam Pillai
Veenai Dhanammal
Vazhuvoor Samraj
T. Brinda
T. Muktha
Valayapatti A. R. Subramaniam
P. R. Thilagam
T. K. Swaminatha Pillai
Namagiripettai Krishnan
Vazhuvoor Manikka Vinayakam
Thiruvarur Bakthavathsalam
S. Somasundaram
Balasaraswathi
Thiruveezhimizhalai Padmashree Subramanya Pillai
Malaikkottai Panchapakesa pillai

Cinema

Udhayanidhi
Sivakarthikeyan

References 

Social groups of Tamil Nadu
Indian castes